Swimming as usual was one of the three aquatics disciplines at the 1980 Summer Olympics—the other two being Water Polo and Diving. It was held in the Swimming Pool of the Olimpiysky Sports Complex between July 20 and July 27.  There was a total of 333 participants from 41 countries competing.

Because the number of participants was reduced by the boycott, FINA broke format by doing away with the semifinals. Instead, the top 8 finishers from the heats qualified directly for the final, or final A as it was called. In events up to 400m, those that finished 9th to 16th in the heats would swim in Final B for the 9th place after the swimmers from Final A swam. This would continue as the Olympic format up to the 1996 Olympic Games.

Events

Participating nations 
333 swimmers from 41 nations competed.

Medal table

Men's events

* Swimmers who participated in the heats only and received medals.

Women's events

* Swimmers who participated in the heats only and received medals.

Gallery of the medalists 
Some of the Olympic medalists in Moscow:

References 

 
1980 Summer Olympics events
1980
1980 in swimming
Swimming in the Soviet Union